Angelo Malvicini (1 May 1895 – 29 December 1949) was an Italian long-distance runner. He competed in the marathon at the 1924 Summer Olympics.

Malvicini also won two individual national championships, with two wins in the marathon (1913, 1922).

See also
Italy at the 1924 Summer Olympics

References

External links
 

1895 births
1949 deaths
Athletes (track and field) at the 1924 Summer Olympics
Italian male long-distance runners
Italian male marathon runners
Olympic athletes of Italy